Vinay Kumar Pathak is an Indian professor (Computer Science) who has served as lecturer, assistant professor at HBTI Kanpur, project scientist at IIT Kanpur and again as professor and dean at HBTI Kanpur before taking over as vice-chancellor UOU on 25 November 2009. After that he has served many universities of Uttarakhand, Rajasthan and UP as Vice Chancellor. He has successfully organized many national and international conferences.

Education 
Pathak did his Bachelor of Technology in computer science from Harcourt Butler Technological Institute, Kanpur, in 1991; M.Tech. from IIT Kharagpur in 1998; and Ph.D. in computer science from U.P. Technical University, Lucknow under the joint guidance of IIT Kanpur, November 2004. Research interests of Pathak include computational geometry and image processing, artificial intelligence, machine learning.

Pathak was instrumental in the implementation of Vedic mathematics in 1992. He worked in Media Lab Asia and successfully did the work of info-sculpture.

Corruption Allegations

Case 
On October 29, 2022, UP Police's Special Task Force started probing charges of bribery, corruption, illegal confinement, and extorting money against him and his alleged associates on the complaint of David Mario Denis whose firm was engaged in exam related work at Dr Bhimrao Ambedkar University in Agra. The FIR was registered in the Indira Nagar police station of Lucknow under section 342, 386, 504, and 506 of the IPC & section 7 of the Prevention of Corruption Act, 1988. Denis claimed to have paid Pathak commission to the tunes of ₹1.4 crore via his associates for clearing of various bills.

The matter came to light when UP STF was probing irregularities in the BAMS exam copy case conducted by Dr Bhimrao Ambedkar University in Agra where Pathak held additional charge of VC between January 2022 and September 2022. Eventually, UP STF arrested Ajay Mishra and Ajay Jain, who were the alleged associates and co-accused in the matter.

As the charges surfaced, six former MLAs from Uttarakhand, where Pathak previously held the position of Vice Chancellor in the Uttarakhand Open University (Haldwani), also wrote to the Governor of Uttar Pradesh Anandiben Patel alleging corruption and unethical acts in his tenure and requesting an investigation led by the Enforcement Directorate and the Central Bureau of Investigation.

Court Ruling 
Pathak then approached the Lucknow bench of Allahabad High Court praying the court to quash the FIR registered against him and to issue direction to the state in the nature of mandamus not to prosecute him on the basis of the FIR. The plea was contested by the Government of Uttar Pradesh stating that the FIR disclosed serious offences committed by Pathak and that he cannot be granted relief from arrest. Thereafter, the two-judge bench of Justice Rajesh Singh Chauhan and Justice VK Singh rejected the writ petition filed by Pathak, granting him no relief on the matter, on November 15, 2022, stated in paragraph 38 of the order that,
 for the reason that bare perusal of the allegations of the FIR and the material/evidences which are said to have been collected during investigation, as recital to this effect has been made in the counter affidavit of the State, disclose, prima facie, commission of cognizable offences subject to final outcome of the investigation, therefore, our aforesaid observations may not be taken adversely against the present petitioner nor it may be treated as protection to the petitioner in any manner whatsoever. The investigating agency or any competent court below should not be influenced from the aforesaid observations of this judgment. The fair and impartial investigation is a bare minimum expectation of this Court and it is also expected from all concerned that the settled proposition of law is followed.

Post-Petition Rejection 
On Tuesday, November 15, 2022, after the High Court rejected Pathak's petition to quash the FIR lodged against him, the UP STF's reluctance to initiate action against Pathak diminished and they issued Pathak a summon to appear in Lucknow on November 18, 2022, at STF's headquarters for questioning and clarification in his case. Pathak was not at his official residence in Kanpur when two sub-inspector rank officials of UP STF reached there with the documents and his VC staff told the officials they had no idea of his whereabouts. STF also setup an electronic surveillance team to trace Pathak’s location.

Shortly after this, the STF team received an email from Pathak stating that he is 'seriously ill' and urged the STF to not summon him before November 25. STF shot a reply to his email seeking the nature of his illness, the details of the doctor he is consulting, and the contact number on which he can be reached. Pathak did not reply to STF's email after which the agency shot another follow up email which also went unanswered. He also failed to show up on the summon issued to him for November 18, 2022. STF then started digging Pathak's passport details and travel history while preparing to issue a lookout notice against him.

Sources from STF told media that Pathak wants to buy time to prepare grounds for evading arrest implying appealing against the High Court order in the Supreme Court of India.

As STF proceeded with the investigation, news of evidence tampering came out from Agra's Dr Bhimrao Ambedkar University where Pathak briefly held additional charge. STF's Agra unit upon visiting the university found out that bills and payment related documents made during Pathak's tenure in the university were indeed tampered with by some employees. STF interrogated some employees in this regard while also writing to the current VC of Agra University for safekeeping of the documents as they were integral evidence for the case against Pathak. 

In January 2023, the Central Bureau of Investigation launched a probe against Pathak for alleged corruption, extortion and criminal intimidation.

References 

Living people
Scholars from Uttarakhand
Rajasthani people
Indian academic administrators
1969 births